Palette is a small French wine AOC in the Provence region of southern France, near Aix-en-Provence. The AOC was established in 1948.

The grapes for this AOC are grown in Aix-en-Provence, Meyreuil, and Le Tholonet. The hamlet of Palette, which gives its name to the AOC, is located on the territory of the commune of Le Tholonet.

AOC rules
Grapes destined for red, white and rosé wines of Palette must be harvested to a yield no greater than 40 hl/ha and the finished wines must all attain a minimum alcohol level of at least 11%. The blend for the reds and rosé must be composed of a minimum 80% Grenache, Mourvedre and/or Cinsault with the remaining 20% permitted to be a blend from Syrah, Carignan Castet, Manosquin, Muscat noir and Cabernet Sauvignon.

The whites of Palette are composed of at least 80% Clairette with Bourboulenc, Trebbiano, Grenache blanc and several white varieties Muscat permitted to round out the remaining 20%.

References

Provence wine AOCs